Mariyahu is a constituency of the Uttar Pradesh Legislative Assembly covering the city of Mariyahu in the Jaunpur district of Uttar Pradesh, India.

Mariyahu is one of five assembly constituencies in the Machhlishahr Lok Sabha constituency. Since 2008, this assembly constituency is numbered 370 amongst 403 constituencies.

Members of Legislative Assembly

Election results

2022

2017
Apna Dal (Sonelal) candidate Leena Tiwari won in 2017 Uttar Pradesh Legislative Elections defeating Samajwadi Party candidate Shraddha Yadav by a margin of 11,350 votes.

References

External links
 

Assembly constituencies of Uttar Pradesh
Politics of Jaunpur district